City college may refer to:

In the United States
 Community college, a type of educational institution sometimes called a junior college or a city college in the United States
 City College of New York
 137th Street – City College (IRT Broadway – Seventh Avenue Line)
 Baltimore City College
 Berkeley City College
 City College (Florida)
 City Colleges of Chicago
 City College of San Francisco
 Fresno City College
 Long Beach City College
 Los Angeles City College
 Pasadena City College
 Sacramento City College
 City College station (Sacramento), the light rail station serving Sacramento City College
 San Diego City College
 City College station
 San Jose City College
 Santa Barbara City College

In the United Kingdom
 City College Brighton and Hove
 City College, Birmingham
 City College Coventry
 City College Manchester
 City College Norwich
 City College Plymouth
 City, University of London, a college of the University of London
 Southampton City College

In Bangladesh
 Government M. M. City College, Khulna
 Chittagong City College
 Dhaka City College

In Canada
La Cité collégiale
 Vancouver Community College, formerly Vancouver City College

In India
 City College Hyderabad
 City College, Kolkata

See also
 City University (disambiguation)